Bruce Banman is a Canadian politician, who was elected to the Legislative Assembly of British Columbia in the 2020 British Columbia general election. He represents the electoral district of Abbotsford South as a member of the British Columbia Liberal Party. Prior to his election to the Legislative Assembly of British Columbia, he was previously the mayor of Abbotsford, British Columbia.

Electoral record

References

Living people
British Columbia Liberal Party MLAs
Mayors of Abbotsford, British Columbia
21st-century Canadian politicians
Year of birth missing (living people)